Howard Haym Hiatt (born July 22, 1925) is a medical researcher involved with the discovery of messenger RNA, past chair from 1963-1972 of the department of medicine at Beth Israel Hospital in Boston, past dean from 1972–1984 of the Harvard School of Public Health, and co-founder and associate chief of the Division of Social Medicine and Health Inequalities at the Brigham and Women's Hospital, where he also helped to launch and for this past decade has been the Associate Chief of the hospital's Division of Global Health Equity, and a founding head of the cancer division of Beth Israel Hospital (now Beth Israel Deaconess Medical Center). He was a member of the team at the Pasteur Institute, Paris, led by Francois Jacob and Jacques Monod which first identified and described messenger RNA, and he was part of the team led by James Watson that was among the first to demonstrate messenger RNA in mammalian cells.
Hiatt was married for 60 years to Doris Bieringer, a librarian who co-founded a reference publication for high school libraries. Hiatt is a member of the Board of Sponsors of the Bulletin of the Atomic Scientists.

Early life and education 
Howard Haym Hiatt was born in Patchogue, New York in 1925 to a Jewish family. His father was an immigrant from Lithuania who lost much of his family in the Holocaust. He enrolled in Harvard College in 1944, and received his medical degree in 1948 from the Harvard Medical School. He was trained in clinical medicine, biochemistry, and molecular biology.

Career
He has been a Harvard University faculty member since 1955. Hiatt was the first Blumgart Professor of Medicine at Harvard Medical School, as well as the physician-in-chief at Beth Israel Hospital in Boston, from 1963 to 1972. During his tenure there, Beth Israel became one of the first teaching hospitals to translate molecular and cell biology to clinical problems and to develop teaching and research programs in primary care. In 1972, Hiatt was to go to Yale as the dean of its medical school, when the then-new president of Harvard University asked him to stay as dean of the Harvard School of Public Health. While he was dean from 1972 to 1984, the School strengthened and greatly broadened its work in quantitative analytic sciences, introduced molecular and cell biology into its research and teaching, began its program in health policy and management—the first in a public health school, and promoted integration of its teaching and research programs with those in other Harvard Faculties. Since 1985, he has been Professor of Medicine at Harvard Medical School and Senior Physician at Brigham and Women's Hospital. He helped develop the Research Training in Clinical Effectiveness Program, which trains physicians to carry out research on issues of quality and costs of medical care. His present research concerns social aspects of health. He helped launch and for the past ten years has been Associate Chief of the Division of Global Health Equity. Hiatt is a member of the Board of Directors of Partners in Health and a member emeritus of the Task Force for Global Health. An accomplished physician, researcher, mentor, and teacher, and a leader in the field of human rights, his work has been widely published and has often appeared in both scholarly and lay publications.

Publications
Hiatt has numerous research articles in publications such as the Journal of Molecular Biology, Journal of Biological Chemistry, the New England Journal of Medicine, and the Journal of the American Medical Association. He has written for the lay press in areas of disease prevention, health services, and the health implications of the nuclear arms race. His book, Medical Lifeboat: Will There Be Room for You in the Health Care System? (published in January 1989 by Harper & Row) outlined methods for addressing some very basic problems of the American healthcare system.

Professional associations

Hiatt is a member of many professional associations, including the Association of American Physicians, the Institute of Medicine (IOM) of the National Academy of Sciences, the American Academy of Arts and Sciences, the American Society for Clinical Investigation, the American Society for Biochemistry and Molecular Biology, and the American Public Health Association. He also has served for several years on boards of Physicians for Human Rights (PHR) in Cambridge, Massachusetts, the Institute for Healthcare Improvement in Cambridge, Partners in Health in Boston, and the Gateway Institute for Pre-College Education Program.

Awards
In 2011, Dartmouth College awarded Hiatt an honorary Doctor of Science (D.Sc.) degree, noting his long career devoted to "improving health care services through care, teaching, research, and advocacy".

Personal life
Hiatt was married to Doris Bieringer, a librarian who co-founded a reference publication for high school libraries; she died in 2007. His father-in-law, Walter H. Bieringer, was active in the Boston area's Jewish Community Council. Beringer served as president of the United Service for New Americans which helped to resettle European Jews in the United States after World War II. Hiatt also served as vice-president of the Associated Jewish Philanthropies of Boston, and as a member of a presidential committee. This committee advised the Truman Administration on displaced persons before being named Head of Massachusetts Commission on Refugees in 1957.

See also
 Comparative effectiveness research
 Messenger RNA

References

External links
 October 2011 video: beginning at 17:15, Howard Hiatt, who served as Dean from 1972 to 1984, discusses his tenure leading HSPH.
 Howard Hiatt discusses his life and his wife, Doris, whom he married after her education at Wellesley College
 Conaboy, C. 02-21-2013 Boston Globe feature on Dr. Howard Hiatt
 Harvard Medical School profile for Howard H. Hiatt
 Harvard Catalyst profile for Howard H. Hiatt, includes very complete bibliography
 Harvard Public Health Review, 75th Anniversary Issues, Volume 11, shows Hiatt as 5th Dean of HSPH, from 1972-1984, page 3, and pages 10-16 - Hiatt had urged closer community health cooperation between the Harvard School of Public Health and the local neighborhoods, including adjacent Mission Hill, Boston (page 11).
 Profile page for Howard Hiatt at Harvard Medical School's Department of Global Health and Social Medicine
 AHRQ 2008 list of AHRQ reward recipients
 Dartmouth College, 2011, Howard Hiatt awarded an honorary Doctor of Science (D.Sc.) from Dartmouth College
 Howard H. Hiatt Papers, 1940-2001 (inclusive), 1975-2001 (bulk), H MS c314. Harvard Medical Library, Francis A. Countway Library of Medicine, Boston, Massachusetts.

1925 births
Living people
People from Patchogue, New York
Harvard Medical School alumni
Harvard College alumni
Jewish American scientists
21st-century American Jews
Members of the National Academy of Medicine